Shimon M. Glick (born 1932) is an American-born Israeli physician.

Personal life
Glick was born in New Jersey.  Married to Brenda, his six children include the rabbi and former member of Knesset Yehuda Glick. Additionally, his son, Rabbi Menachem Glick acts as the mashgiach of the reputable Bais Yisroel Yeshiva, founded 1985.

Career

Glick is a graduate of SUNY Downstate Medical Center.  
 He did his medical training (internship, residency) at Yale University Medical Center 
 Residency Mount Sinai Hospital Internal Medicine in New York. 
 Research fellow, Endocrinology, at the Bronx Veterans Administration Hospital in the laboratory of Berson and Yalow (Nobel Laureate).
 First to Isolate Growth Hormone – with Jesse Roth MD
 First to measure Growth Hormone – with Jesse Roth MD
 First to discover Growth Hormone – Insulin relationship with Jesse Roth MD
 Before moving to Israel in 1974, Glick was Chief of Medical Services at the Coney Island Hospital in Brooklyn 
 Clinical Professor of Medicine at Downstate Medical Center.
 Gussie Krupp Chair of Internal Medicine – 1977
 Chairmam of Department of Medicine Soroka Medical Center, Beer Sheba, Israel 1974–1997
 President of Israel Society of Endocrinology 1979–82
 Dean of Ben Gurion University School of Heath Sciences 1986–1990
 Lord Immanuel Jakobavitz Chair of Medical Ethics – 1985
 Ombudsman of Israel Health ministry 1997–2008
 Director of Center of Medical Education – Ben Gurion University 
 Distinguished Citizen Award Beer Sheba 2012
 Considered World Leader in Medical Ethics and Medical Education
 Editor of Israel Journal of Medical Science 1974–97

Awards and honors
 2014 Bonei Zion (Builders of Zion) Prize
 Member of the Institute of Medicine of the National Academy of Sciences of the United States
 1955 - The Mitchell Prize - Best qualified in Departments of Medicine - State University of NY
 1984 - Newman Award - on his courageous stand during The Doctors Strike
 1988- Outstanding Scientist - Samuel & Paula Elklis
 2004 - Lifelong Achievement Award - Israel Health Ministry
 2012 - Lifelong Achievement Award - Israel Society of Internal Medicine
 2014 - Lifelong Achievement Award - "Bonei Zion" Nefesh BeNefesh

References

1932 births
Living people
American emigrants to Israel
American medical academics
American Orthodox Jews
Academic staff of Ben-Gurion University of the Negev
Bonei Zion Prize recipients
Israeli Orthodox Jews
Israeli endocrinologists
Jewish educators
Jewish physicians
Members of the National Academy of Medicine
Physicians from New Jersey
SUNY Downstate Medical Center alumni